Adjacent to the 185-acre Great Meadows conservation land, the Waldorf School of Lexington (WSL), located in Lexington, Massachusetts, was founded in 1971 and serves students from preschool through grade 8. The school offers a challenging academic program, provided by faculty educated in the understanding of students’ cognitive, emotional, and physical developmental stages.

A member of a global network of Waldorf schools, WSL provides a rich, rounded curriculum with a balance of academics, arts, music, and physical education. Beginning in first grade, the program integrates humanities and sciences with creative arts as well as two foreign languages. From grades 3–8, all students study a string or woodwind instrument and play together in a school ensemble or orchestra. The dramatic arts animate the curriculum with all elementary students participating in a class play yearly.

WSL expands its classrooms into the natural surroundings with a gardening program, farm and field trips, nature observation and walks on conservation land, and through its seasonal, community festivals. Athletics and movement are an important part of every student's day through eighth grade.

Sustained by a vibrant community of educators and supported by engaged parents, the school's educational philosophy and culture instills in students respect for themselves, for each other, and for the living world around them. Our graduates enroll in a wide variety of independent and public high schools, colleges, and universities. WSL prepares students for a lifetime of engaged, self-directed learning.

The Waldorf School of Lexington is accredited by the New England Association of Schools and Colleges (NEASC) and the Association of Waldorf Schools of North America (AWSNA). The school is also a member of the Association of Independent Schools of New England (AISNE) and the National Association of Independent Schools (NAIS).

History
(Source: Waldorf School of Lexington: History of Our School)

Guided by the educational philosophy of Rudolf Steiner, the Waldorf School opened in 1971 as a kindergarten and day care center with a handful of children in a Cambridge church basement. In its third year, the school's three faculty members decided to apply for membership in the Association of Waldorf Schools of North America (AWSNA). For six years the school was sponsored by the Waldorf School of Garden City, NY. By the end of the decade, the school had expanded to sixth grade and had become a full member of AWSNA.

In 1980, the school rented the historic Adams School building in Lexington to accommodate the growing number of students. From 1981 to 1984, enrollment increased significantly and the school purchased the Adams building from the town of Lexington in 1983. In 1982, the first eighth grade graduated.

In 1990, a formal Waldorf Parent-Teacher Association was formed, and in 1991 the board of trustees elected a parent as its first non-faculty president. During this year, the school was accepted into the Association of Independent Schools of New England (AISNE).

During the 1995–96 school year, the faculty and Board developed a new long-range plan. It established a goal of founding a high school, while keeping the elementary strong. The high school started out in the basement of the Follen Church at 755 Massachusetts Avenue, with ten students in ninth grade.

In 1998, the school successfully conducted a capital campaign to purchase the historic building adjacent to the existing site. Beginning in October, the building at 703 Massachusetts Avenue was gutted and renovated to house up to 56 students on three floors. The High School moved into its new quarters in the spring of 1999, and in June 2000, the first twelfth grade graduated.

In 2002, the school was evaluated by a team from AWSNA and NEASC (New England Association of Schools and Colleges.) The school received accreditation from both organizations.

In 2003, it was decided that the high school would become a separate entity. The high school formed its own board of trustees and is now the Waldorf High School of Massachusetts Bay. The high school moved to Belmont, MA, in July 2004 to accommodate its growing enrollment.

The school's second building at 703 Massachusetts Avenue, which dates to 1828 and is the oldest brick structure in Lexington, was renovated in 2005 to house the expanded nursery and after-school programs.

From September 2006 to June 2014, the Waldorf School boasted among its pupils future Lexington High School athletes and local entrepreneurs Alvaro Mendoza and Owen Graham O'Regan, as well as accomplished musicians Caroline Dressler, Giulia Haible and Ava Montesi (an attendee from 2006 to 2011), who would release several folk records as solo acts and as a trio in the years following their graduation. The class of 2014, referred to by contemporaries simply as "That one class", was taught by longtime educator and visual artist Helena Niiva, who would continue teaching younger students at Lexington Waldorf after her 2014 graduates entered high school.   
The '14 cohort is distinct from classes preceding and following for the presence of several culturally prominent individuals in its ranks, including environmental engineer Milo Rossi, cartoonist Lucas Freeburg, artist and graphic designer Jacob Siu-Zmuidzinas, Bedford ice hockey star Ryan Welsh, and noted software developer John Henry Sieber.

As of 2016, the school offers programs for children from birth through eighth grade, including:
- a range of parent-child programs for children from 0–3 years
- play-based nursery and kindergarten
- an arts-integrated academic program for grades 1–8, including 2 foreign languages
- after-school athletics
- after-school programs
- summer camp
- summer storytime

References

External links
 Waldorf School of Lexington
 MACRIS Listing - Adams School

Waldorf schools in the United States
Educational institutions established in 1971
Buildings and structures in Lexington, Massachusetts
Private elementary schools in Massachusetts
Private middle schools in Massachusetts
Schools in Middlesex County, Massachusetts